Carstensz East (or East Carstensz Top, Carstensz Oriental, Carstensz Timor ) is a sub peak of Puncak Jaya (or Carstensz Pyramid). It contains a small glacier like its nearby neighbors, but it is retreating rapidly. It is one of the only places in Indonesia with snow all year, but due to increase of temperature it could lose its snow in 2025.

Google Maps is calling Carstensz East alternatively Puncak Jaya Wijaya.

References 

Mountains of Western New Guinea
Four-thousanders of New Guinea